Pachydesmus is a genus of flat-backed millipedes in the family Xystodesmidae. There are about 12 described species in Pachydesmus.

Species
These 12 species belong to the genus Pachydesmus:

 Pachydesmus attemsi Wang, 1961
 Pachydesmus bazanensis Takakuwa, 1942
 Pachydesmus clarus (Chamberlin, 1918)
 Pachydesmus crassicutis (Wood, 1864)
 Pachydesmus cummingsiensis Verhoeff, 1944
 Pachydesmus denticulatus Chamberlin, 1946
 Pachydesmus duplex Chamberlin, 1939
 Pachydesmus incursus Chamberlin, 1939
 Pachydesmus kisatchinsis Chamberlin, 1942
 Pachydesmus laticollis (Attems, 1899)
 Pachydesmus retrorsus Chamberlin, 1921
 Pachydesmus simulans Chamberlin, 1942

References

Further reading

 
 

Polydesmida
Articles created by Qbugbot